Macarostola callischema is a moth of the family Gracillariidae. It is known from Meghalaya, India.

References

Macarostola
Moths of Asia
Moths described in 1908